2001 World Junior Championships may refer to:

 Figure skating: 2001 World Junior Figure Skating Championships
 Ice hockey: 2001 World Junior Ice Hockey Championships
 Motorcycle speedway: 2001 Individual Speedway Junior World Championship

See also
 2001 World Cup (disambiguation)
 2001 Continental Championships (disambiguation)
 2001 World Championships (disambiguation)